Usman Sani Hassan Sale (born 27 August 1995) is a Nigerian footballer who plays as a winger.

Career
Sale signed for Viking FK on a four-year deal in January 2016 together with fellow countryman Aniekpeno Udo. He scored his first goal for the club against Bodø/Glimt in the 29th round of the 2016 season. In October 2019, Sale's contract with Viking was terminated.

In December 2019, Sale signed for Veikkausliiga side Kuopion Palloseura.

Career statistics

Honours
Viking
1. divisjon: 2018
Norwegian Football Cup: 2019

Individual
Veikkausliiga Breakthrough of the Year: 2020

References

External links
Profile for Veikkausliiga

1995 births
Living people
Nigerian footballers
Viking FK players
Kuopion Palloseura players
AC Oulu players
Eliteserien players
Norwegian First Division players
Veikkausliiga players
Nigerian expatriate footballers
Expatriate footballers in Norway
Nigerian expatriate sportspeople in Norway
Expatriate footballers in Finland
Nigerian expatriate sportspeople in Finland
Association football wingers
Sportspeople from Jos